Cambridge School of Culinary Arts (CSCA) is a professional school located in Cambridge, Massachusetts. It offers several certificate and professional programs, including a culinary studies and pastry specialization. It also offers a variety of open-enrollment, one-day classes available to the general public.

History
Cambridge School of Culinary Arts was founded in 1974 by Roberta L. Dowling, CCP with classes in classical European cookery from her home. With the expansion of the program, Dowling moved the program to its current location at 2020 Massachusetts Avenue in Cambridge, Massachusetts. The program grew to over 400 students by the 1980s when Dowling decided to apply for accreditation for the school.  The school was accredited in 1981 by the Commonwealth of Massachusetts, Department of Education and then by NATTS (National Association of Trade and Technical Schools) in 1989.

Programs Offered
The Cambridge School of Culinary Arts offers a diverse set of programs including-

Professional Programs
  Professional Chefs Program - 37 weeks in length with 20 hours of instruction per week
 Professional Pastry Program - 37 weeks in length with 20 hours of instruction per week headed by French Master Pastry Chef Delphin Gomes
 Culinary Certificate Program - 16 weeks in length with 19 hours of instruction per week
 Certificate Pastry Program - 16 weeks in length with 19 hours of instruction per week headed by French Master Pastry Chef Delphin Gomes

Recreational Programs
The school offers a diverse blend of recreational classes for amateur cooks and professionals.  Examples include classes on preparing classical sauces, gluten free cooking, multi-day basic cooking classes, ethnic cookery, knife skills, pastry, and other frequently arising topics of interest.

Culinary Excursions
The school has also offered culinary trips for both amateurs and professional chefs.  Past trips have included Umbria, Italy and San Marino, Italy as well as Beijing, Xi'an, Suzhou, Shanghai, Hong Kong.

Accreditations
The Cambridge School of Culinary Arts is accredited by-
 Massachusetts Department of Education
 The National Association of Trade and Technical Schools (NATTS)  The school replaced its NATTS accreditation with ACCSCT 
 The Accrediting Commission of Career Schools and Colleges of Technology (ACCSCT)  The school voluntarily relinquished its ACCSC (formerly ACCSCT) accreditation in June 2015.
 It is also endorsed by the International Association of Culinary Professionals (IACP)

Notable alumni
Chefs:
Karen Akunowicz '05, Fox & the Knife
Matthew Barre '05, Farm & Fries
Mary Ting Hyatt '08, Bagelsaurus
Samuel Ostrow '08, Festina Lente
Greg Reeves '03, Viale
Remi Williams, Smoke & Salt
Katie and Richard Chudy, The Skinny Beet
Tiffani Faison ‘03, Sweet Cheeks, Tiger Mama, Fool’s Errand, Orfano 
Food Production Related Businesses:
Davio's Restaurant, with locations in MA & PA - Steve DiFillippo '84
Off Broadway Diner, Taunton, MA - Nuno Souza '02
Hash House a go go, San Diego, CA - Craig "Andy" Beardslee '88

Notes

External links
Cambridge School of Culinary Arts

Cooking schools in the United States
Hospitality schools in the United States
Educational institutions established in 1974
Universities and colleges in Cambridge, Massachusetts
Private universities and colleges in Massachusetts